Feelin' Good is the seventh studio album by Nightmares on Wax. It was released in 2013 on Warp. It peaked at number 24 on the Billboard Top Dance/Electronic Albums chart.

Critical reception

At Metacritic, which assigns a weighted average score out of 100 to reviews from mainstream critics, the album received an average score of 65, based on 12 reviews, indicating "generally favorable reviews".

Track listing

Charts

References

External links
 

2013 albums
Nightmares on Wax albums
Warp (record label) albums